Thalamarchella is a genus of moths of the family Depressariidae described by Thomas Bainbrigge Fletcher in 1940.

Species
 Thalamarchella alveola Felder & Rogenhofer, 1875
 Thalamarchella aneureta Common, 1964
 Thalamarchella robinsoni Common, 1964

References

 
Depressariinae
Moth genera